Nagarjuna is a Buddhist teacher of the 3rd century CE.

Nagarjuna or Nagarjun may also refer to:
 Nagarjuna (actor) (born 1959), Indian film actor
 Nagarjuna Power Plant, north of Mangalore
 Nagarjuna Hospital, Vijayawada, Andhra Pradesh
 Nagarjun (1911–1998), Indian author
 Nagarjuna (metallurgist), of 10th century India
 Nagarjun, Nepal, a town in far western Nepal
Nagarjun Municipality (Kathmandu Valley)
 Naagarjuna – Ek Yoddha, India television series
 Nagarjuna (film), a 1961 Indian Kannada film